John Dowling (1930–1998) was an Irish sportsperson.  He played Gaelic football for his local Kerins O'Rahilly's club and at senior level for the Kerry county team between 1954 and 1961.  Dowling captained Kerry to the All-Ireland SFC title in 1955. He won Munster and All-Ireland Junior Medals with Kerry in 1949. He also won a Munster Minor Championship medal in 1948.

References

 

1930 births
1998 deaths
All-Ireland-winning captains (football)
Kerins O'Rahilly's Gaelic footballers
Kerry inter-county Gaelic footballers
Munster inter-provincial Gaelic footballers
People from Tralee